The 2021 Idemitsu Mazda MX-5 Cup presented by BF Goodrich was a single-make motor racing championship, the 17th season of the Mazda MX-5 Cup and the 1st under a new sanctioning agreement with the International Motor Sports Association (IMSA). The series began on January 28 at Daytona International Speedway, and concluded on November 12 at Michelin Raceway Road Atlanta after 14 rounds. Gresham Wagner won the driver's championship, earning Spark Performance the entrant's championship as well. Sam Paley won the Rookie of the Year championship with McCumbee McAleer Racing.

Schedule 
The schedule was initially announced on October 28, 2020, and features 14 rounds across seven double-header weekends. On December 17, 2020, the schedule was revised, along with the 2021 WeatherTech SportsCar Championship schedule, due to the ongoing COVID-19 pandemic.

On January 6, 2021, the St. Petersburg event was rescheduled from its March date to April 23–25, due to the COVID-19 pandemic.

On February 8, 2021, IMSA announced an additional double-header event to be held during the 12 Hours of Sebring event weekend in March. Rounds 3 and 4 at Sebring will serve as a replacement for a future race venue to be announced at a later date. Thus, the 2021 MX-5 Cup Championship will still be composed of 14 rounds at seven tracks.

On April 7, 2021, the Canadian Tire Motorsport Park event scheduled for July 2-4 was cancelled due to COVID-19 quarantine requirements.

All races are 45 minutes in length.

Confirmed Entries 
All competitors utilize the Mazda MX-5 Cup car, modified to their homologated racing specification by Flis Performance.

 = Eligible for Rookie's Championship

Race Results

Championship Standings

Points System 
Championship points are awarded at the finish of each event according to the chart below.

For each race, bonus points are awarded for the following:

 The ten (10) additional points for achieving pole position are not awarded if the starting grid is determined by “Other Means”.
 In the case of a tie for the most laps led, the Competitor that finishes the highest in the running order is declared the winner.
 In the case of a tie for the fastest Race lap, the Competitor that first achieves the fastest Race lap is declared the winner.

Driver's Championship 
IMSA recognizes Driver champions based on the total number of championship points earned during the season.

Bold = Pole Position

Italics = Fastest Race Lap

Underline = Most Laps Led

† = Post-race penalty; moved to back of class

Entrant's Championship 
Each Entrant receives championship points for its highest Car finishing position in each class in each race. The positions of subsequent finishing cars from the same entrant are not considered in the results and all other cars are elevated in the finishing positions accordingly.

Bold = Pole Position

Italics = Fastest Race Lap

Underline = Most Laps Led

Rookie's Championship 
Rookie points are awarded based on the Car’s finishing position for each Rookie Driver, with the finishing positions of Cars without Rookie Drivers not considered in the results and all other Cars with Rookie Drivers elevated in the finishing positions accordingly.

† = Post-race penalty; moved to back of class

References

External links 
 Official Website

Mazda MX-5